ISS node may refer to:

 Unity (ISS module), node 1
 Harmony (ISS module), node 2
 Tranquility (ISS module), node 3
 Node 4, partially constructed, once considered for the ISS